Alečković is a Serbo-Croatian surname. It may refer to:

 Emir Alečković (born 1979), Bosnian referee
  (born 1944), Bosnian painter
  (born 1959), Serbian clinical psychologist, professor and writer
 Mira Alečković (1924—2008), Serbian poet
  (1966-2012), Croatian police commander
  (born 1957), Serbian painter

Serbian surnames
Bosnian surnames